The Globe (Sydney, N.S.W.: 1911–1914) was a weekly English language newspaper published by Alfred Herbert Howard Aldworth in Sydney, New South Wales, Australia.

Newspaper history 
The Globe was first published on 5 April 1911 and continued under this masthead until 17 October 1914, which was its 185th issue. In these years it was published by Alfred Herbert Howard Aldworth for the "Sunday times" Newspaper Co. Ltd. The newspaper then became known, on 24 October 1914, as The Globe and Sunday Times War Pictorial. Hugh Donald McIntosh took over publishing. On 6 November 2016 the title reverted to The Globe until its last issue on 25 June 1917 (issue no. 328).  In 1917, The Globe and Sunday Times War Pictorial merged with The Mirror of Australia to form The Mirror whose first publication was 30 June 1917.

Digitisation 
The Globe has been digitised as part of the Australian Newspapers Digitisation Program of the National Library of Australia.

See also 
 List of newspapers in Australia
 List of newspapers in New South Wales

External links

References 

Defunct newspapers published in Sydney